Black Wind is an adventure novel by Clive Cussler and Dirk Cussler. This book centers on a relatively new character to the book series, Dirk Pitt, Jr.

The novel centers around a terrorist plot to launch a biological warfare attack on the United States; Dirk Pitt Jr., his father, and his sister Summer must foil the plot and expose and stop the antagonists before a deadly toxin can be spread in released over Los Angeles, California.

Plot
In December 1944, the commanding officer of the I-403, a Japanese I-400 class submarine, is given orders to launch a mysterious attack on the United States, a mission involving Japan’s notorious biological warfare group, Unit 731.  The I-403 reaches the U.S. northwest coast, but is sunk before the mission can be carried out.

In May 2007, 62 years later, a team of CDC researchers, including beautiful field epidemiologist Sarah Matson, are unexpectedly infected by a deadly and mystery illness in the Aleutian islands; they are rescued by Dirk Pitt Jr. (hereinafter Pitt Jr.), who is nearby on a NUMA research vessel.  Pitt Jr, with friend and coworker Jack Dahlgren, return to the site to investigate, but their helicopter is downed by gunfire from a mysterious trawler.  They survive, eventually determining that the illness resulted from a toxic compound of cyanide and smallpox.

In Japan, the U.S. ambassador is golfing with his British counterpart when he is assassinated by a sniper named Tongju.  Tongju later assassinates the ambassador’s deputy and a semiconductor executive, leaving clues that appear to identify him as a member of a Japanese terrorist group.

Investigating the toxin, Pitt Jr. consults marine-history researcher St. Julien Perlmutter, who finds records of the I-403.  Pitt Jr. and Dahlgren find and dive on the sunken I-403, but its mysterious ordnance has been removed.  Meanwhile, in the Philippines, Dirk Pitt senior (hereinafter referred to simply as Dirk) and his friend and colleague Al Giordino are also discovering forgotten Japanese ordnance that is poisoning marine life.

In Incheon, South Korea, Dae-jong Kang, a multi-millionaire industrialist, is secretly a North Korean sleeper agent who has been using corruption to press for rapid reunification of the divided peninsula under the DPRK's rule. Kang reviews his plans with his assistant; they include framing a U.S. serviceman for the murder of a South Korean girl to foment unrest, while Tongju retrieves more of the World War II toxin from a second sunken submarine.  Learning of the interference of Pitt Jr., Kang sends assassins to eliminate him.

The assassins track down but fail to kill Pitt Jr and Matson on Vashon Island in Washington; Pitt Jr. is just able to jump his recently purchased 1958 Chrysler 300-D convertible aboard the Vashon Island Ferry, while Kang’s assassins crash their car and drown.

NUMA researcher Hiram Yeager has discovered that the toxic ordnance was also carried by a Japanese submarine lost in the South China Sea.  Pitt Jr. joins his sister Summer and father aboard a NUMA salvage vessel that locates the wreck, but Tongju and his commando team seize the vessel. After taking the recovered toxin and kidnapping Pitt Jr and Summer, the North Koreans sabotage the salvage ship and leave the imprisoned crew to drown, but Dirk is able to help everyone escape.

Pitt Jr. and Summer are taken to Kang’s yacht, where the multimillionaire taunts them with a general threat of infecting the U.S. with the hybrid toxin, then leaves them to drown. They are able to escape (with the aid of Clive Cussler) and make their way back to the United States.

Unaware of the exact nature of Kang’s plan, the NUMA team coordinates with government agencies to search for cargo vessels that might be carrying the toxin.  However, the real plan goes forward as Tongju and his commando team pirate Sea Launch, a seaborne rocket-launching platform, preparing to fire a toxin-laden warhead at a G8 summit meeting in Los Angeles. When Dirk and Giordino spot the launch platform from a blimp, a deadly countdown is already underway. However, Dirk manages to infiltrate and alter the launch, resulting in the rocket crashing harmlessly into the sea.

In the final showdown, Pitt Jr. and a team of Navy SEALs infiltrate Kang's base as he prepares his final getaway aboard his luxury yacht. After an epic showdown, ignoring the chief SEAL, Pitt Jr. grabs him and jumps off the luxury yacht, letting it – and Kang – crash and explode into the North Korean side of the river.

Release details
2004, United States, Putnam Adult, First Edition, November 2004, Hardcover
2006, United States, G. P. Putnam's Sons, Reprint Edition, June 2006, Paperback.
2004, United States, Norwood Press, Limited Edition, November 2004, Hardcover.

2004 American novels
Dirk Pitt novels
American thriller novels
G. P. Putnam's Sons books
Collaborative novels